The men's C-2 200 metres competition at the 2019 ICF Canoe Sprint World Championships in Szeged took place at the Olympic Centre of Szeged.

Schedule
The schedule was as follows:

All times are Central European Summer Time (UTC+2)

Results

Heats
Heat winners advanced directly to the A final.
The next six fastest boats in each heat advanced to the semifinals.

Heat 1

Heat 2

Heat 3

Semifinals
Qualification was as follows:

The fastest three boats in each semi advanced to the A final.
The next four fastest boats in each semi, plus the fastest remaining boat advanced to the B final.

Semifinal 1

Semifinal 2

Finals

Final B
Competitors in this final raced for positions 10 to 18.

Final A
Competitors raced for positions 1 to 9, with medals going to the top three.

References

ICF